Juan dAnyelica is a jazz flamenco guitarist from Spain who plays extensively throughout Mexico. He is widely considered to be the finest guitarist in Cancun and the state of Quintana Roo. He has played live shows at several locations in Cancun such as Roots Jazz Club, the Grand Oasis and Melia Resorts. He worked with Paco de Lucia on his album Cositas Buenas And has won a Latin Emmy award. He has appeared at the Cancun Jazz Festival.

Anyelica's albums include Flamenco Fussion - Live… One Night At Roots (1998) and "Salud."

References

External links
Cancun Jazz Festival 2001
Website

Year of birth missing (living people)
Living people
Spanish flamenco guitarists
Spanish male guitarists
Spanish jazz guitarists
Flamenco guitarists
Male jazz musicians